Trí Phải is a commune (xã) and village in Thới Bình District, Cà Mau Province, in southern Vietnam.

History
In 1987 it was reported that the communes of Trí Phải Tây and Trí Phải Trung merged. At the time the commune of Trí Phải Tây had a population of 4,140 people and covered an area of 4,339 hectares.

As of 2009 the area was 38.7 km² and the population was 11,894, with a density of 307.4/km². The age breakdown was
 0–14 years: 2,930
 15–64 years: 8,290
 65+ years: 680

Administrative divisions
The commune is divided administratively into the following subcommunes:

Trí Phải Tây
Trí Phải Trung
Trí Phải Đông
Trí Phải

Landmarks
Trí Phải contains the adjacent churches Nhà thờ Huyện Sử and Nhà Thờ Trí Phải.

References

Populated places in Cà Mau province
Communes of Cà Mau province